Malcolm George Baker (born 13 August 1947) is an Australian spree killer from Terrigal, New South Wales, currently serving six sentences of life imprisonment for the shooting massacre of seven people, including an unborn child, in Terrigal, Bateau Bay and Wyong on the evening of 27 October 1992 (known as the Central Coast massacre).

Shootings
The shootings started at 9:12 p.m. at the Terrigal apartment of his ex-girlfriend Kerry Gannon and her younger sister Lisa Gannon. Baker used his shotgun to smash the front window. Twenty-two-year-old Christopher Gall, a friend of the sisters, was the first person shot, suffering a gunshot wound to the face. Baker then entered the house and shot Gannon dead. Moving through the house he shot dead Lisa, who was eight months pregnant; later efforts to save her unborn baby failed. Their father, Thomas Gannon, 43, who had been visiting for a few days, was found dead in the street.

Baker then drove to the resort of Bateau Bay, where he arrived about ten minutes later, at the home of his 27-year-old son David.  Baker shot his son through the back of his head. His body was discovered in the back yard of the home he shared with his wife and baby.

Baker then went to the home of Ross Smith, 35, and Leslie Read, 25, in Wyong, 15 kilometres north of Bateau Bay. Arriving there shortly before 10 p.m., he shot and critically injured Read, then finding Smith in the bathtub shot and killed him instantly. Read died two hours later in hospital. Smith and Baker had had a confrontation about two years prior, over a business deal gone sour.

At 11.00 p.m., Baker walked into Toukley police station, surrendered, and handed over a Sawed-off Remington 12-gauge double-barrelled shotgun. He was charged with six counts of murder and one count of attempted murder.

Incarceration

Baker was one of the first six inmates of Goulburn Gaol's High Risk Management Unit upon its creation in 2001.

References

1992 in Australia
20th-century Australian criminals
Australian prisoners sentenced to multiple life sentences
Australian murderers of children
Australian spree killers
Criminals from New South Wales
Place of birth missing (living people)
People convicted of murder by New South Wales
Prisoners sentenced to life imprisonment by New South Wales
Living people
1947 births
Australian people convicted of murder